The  singles competition of the 2004 Hastings Direct International Championships was part of the 30th edition of the Eastbourne International tennis tournament, Tier II of the 2004 WTA Tour. It was won by Svetlana Kuznetsova, who defeated Daniela Hantuchová 2–6, 7–6(7–2), 6–4.

Chanda Rubin was the defending champion but did not compete that year.

Seeds
The champion seed is indicated in bold text. Text in italics indicates the round in which that seed was eliminated. The top four seeds received a bye to the second round.

  Amélie Mauresmo (semifinals)
  Svetlana Kuznetsova (champion)
  Ai Sugiyama (quarterfinals)
  Vera Zvonareva (semifinals)
  Silvia Farina Elia (first round)
  Anna Smashnova-Pistolesi (first round)
  Francesca Schiavone (second round)
  Magdalena Maleeva (quarterfinals)

Draw

Final

Top half

Bottom half

References

External links
 2004 Hastings Direct International Championships Draw

Singles
Hastings Direct International Championships